Meadowvale is a large suburban district located in the northwestern part of Mississauga, Ontario, Canada, just west of Toronto. In the 19th and early 20th centuries, Meadowvale Village in Toronto Township was established nearby and named for the meadows along the Credit River. By the 1970s the village would diminish with the current area to the west selected to be the site of a "new town" for the newly (1974) incorporated City of Mississauga and took the Meadowvale name, while "Village" was added to the historic community. This newer section comprises the bulk of the district today, and includes Lisgar, another former hamlet of which no trace remains today.

Geography
The community is situated near the Credit River which lies to the east. Mixed forest is located along the Credit River valley which covers most of the central part of the district. Another creek named Levi Creek runs to the south and southwest and is a tributary of the Credit lying to the south.

The rough boundaries of Meadowvale are: Ninth Line, Mavis Road, Highway 407, Britannia Road.

Meadowvale has two lakes, Aquitaine and Wabukayne, both of which were largely man-made. A system of parks and trails connects the two lakes, which are located about 1.5 kilometres apart.

Demographics

Population of Meadowvale as a whole
1996: 63,095
2001: 84,225
2006: 99,700 (estimated population)
2009: 104,540
For planning purposes the city of Mississauga is divided into 24 districts. Here are the estimated 2009 populations for districts which comprise the area known as Meadowvale.
 Meadowvale 43,500
 Lisgar 34,500
 Meadowvale Village 26,500
Percentage visible minority population
1996: 22.6%
2001: 31.6%
2009: 46.6%
Breakdown of visible minority population as of 2009
 South Asian 24.3%
 Black 11.7%
 Chinese 6.4%
 Filipino 5.2%
 Arab/West Asian 3.8%
 Latin American 3.2%

History

Meadowvale Village
Meadowvale Village was established in 1819 by Irish immigrants from New York state lead by John Beatty. In the village's early years, the main industry was milling, with the mills drawing power from the Credit River. Gooderham and Worts owned and operated many businesses in the village in the 1860s and 1870s, including a mill.

The historic village was named for the meadows along the Credit River. The village was frequented by Group of Seven artists A.Y. Jackson and A.J. Casson whom painted nearby scenes. Casson frequented the area as his grandmother lived in the old village.

There are some traces of the former village including Old Derry Road Bridge over Credit River, Commercial Hotel (c. 1850s now private residence), Millworker Houses (private residences), Meadowvale Village Hall (old school house c. 1871) and Exous Apostolic Church (former United Church) on Second Line West.

Meadowvale
The current community of Meadowvale was created as the old village waned. The multi-lane, controlled access MacDonald-Cartier Freeway, also known as Kings Highway 401, was opened south of Meadowvale Village in 1959. In 1968, Meadowvale was incorporated into the new Town of Mississauga. In the 1970s, farmland west of the original Meadowvale Village was developed into a series of subdivisions that make up much of present-day Meadowvale. This area has continued to expand ever since, and now fills most of the northwest corner of Mississauga.

Meadowvale Village remains and is located adjacent to the largest business park area in Mississauga, with the second largest being located in between Meadowvale Village and Meadowvale along the Highway 401 corridor, where numerous major corporations have recently located their offices, factories and research and development facilities, including:

Wal-Mart Canada - Retailer
Chrysler Canada - Car
Siemens - Electronics
GlaxoSmithKline - Pharmaceuticals
Magna International - Auto Parts
Microsoft - Software
Tech Data - Computer parts Distributor
Biovail - Bio-medical
DuPont - Chemicals
Fujitsu - Computer
Mitutoyo - Measuring Equipment
Sandvik - Materials and Metallurgy
FANUC Robotics - CNC controllers
Snap-on - Tools
Purolator Courier - Courier
Royal Bank of Canada - Bank
Maple Leaf Foods - Food Manufacturer
Tech Data - IT Components Distributor
Mary Kay - Cosmetics
Royal LePage - Real Estate
D-Link - Computer/Networking Parts
Vivid Entertainment - Adult Services
Ashley Madison - Dating Website
Cascades - Packaging
Bureau Veritas - Food Quality Assessment

In recognition of its many historical buildings, Meadowvale Village was recognized as Ontario’s first Heritage Conservation District in 1980. To reduce traffic through the village, the Derry Road by-pass was built in the mid-1990s. Located about one kilometre north of the Old Derry Road, the new Derry Road is a major east-west traffic artery running from Mississauga Road to Mavis Road.

In June 2006, Meadowvale found itself in an international media spotlight, as a number of former Meadowvale Secondary School students were among those charged in an alleged terror plot to bomb well-known Canadian buildings and assassinate political leaders.

Transportation

Freeway
Meadowvale is accessed via Highway 401 via Winston Churchill Boulevard, Mississauga Road, or Mavis Road. The tolled Highway 407 bypasses Meadowvale along its northern border before continuing south to Oakville and east to Brampton.

Major thoroughfares
Winston Churchill Blvd., Erin Mills Parkway and Mavis Road are major north-south roads that connect Meadowvale to the rest of Mississauga and neighbouring Brampton. Derry and Britannia Roads are major east-west roads.

Interurban transit
Meadowvale GO Station serves as a hub for GO Transit operations. It is an intersection point for GO Transit in the north west of the GTA. The station is serviced by one rail/bus line and three bus lines. The station offers express hourly service to the two largest transit hubs in the GTA, York University and Union Station.

 The station is located along the Milton Line rail line, which offers rush hour train service to downtown in the morning and from downtown in the evening. Bus service is provided for the reverse-commuter and during non-rush hour periods.
 York University Express along Highway 407. With some service via Bramalea GO Station and Highway 407 & Hurontario.
 Milton 401 service - Milton via Meadowvale to Yorkdale and Finch Terminal.
 University of Guelph Service to York University via Meadowvale, Highway 407 & Hurontario and Bramalea GO Station.

GO Transit buses arriving from Milton, pass by Meadowvale Town Centre on their way to Meadowvale GO Station.

MiWay offers a shuttle bus service to and from Meadowvale GO Station during rush hour.

Lisgar GO Station, which opened in September 2007, provides service to commuters living in newly developed areas in the western portion of Meadowvale. Construction of a GO Transit bus garage at Alpha Mills Road and Mississauga Road has also been proposed. (completed in 2009)

Local transit
Meadowvale Town Centre is MiWay's third largest terminal. It is the second largest in Mississauga, after the main terminal, Square One.

MiWay offers local transit, as well as service to Kipling Subway Station and Square One.

Pearson Airport is serviced indirectly via either the 42 Derry Road bus or Square One bus terminal.

Trails
Meadowvale also has a series of bike and walking trails, offering access to, among other things, schools, parks, the Meadowvale Town Centre and the Meadowvale Community Centre.

Sports and Recreation

Meadowvale is the former home to Burlington Twins of the Intercounty Baseball League from 2009-2010 before moving to Burlington. Meadowvale is also home to the minor hockey team the "Meadowvale Hawks", which is part of the Mississauga Hockey League (MHL). In 2016, after two years of construction, and at a cost $37 million, the Meadowvale Community Centre re-opened. This provided Meadowvale residents with access to fitness facilities, a library, a pool, and meeting areas. The community centre is located on the shore of Lake Aquitaine.

Notable people from or residing in Meadowvale
Billy Talent band members Ian D'Sa, Aaron Solowoniuk, Benjamin Kowalewicz, and Jonathan Gallant.
Joel Gibb, lead vocalist of the indie pop band The Hidden Cameras
Maitreyi Ramakrishnan, Tamil Canadian actress.

References

External links

PDF of Meadowvale: Mills to Millennium by Kathleen A. Hicks

Neighbourhoods in Mississauga
Populated places on the Credit River